Seda Vermisheva (9 October 1932 – 18 February 2020) was an Armenian-Russian poet, economist and public activist.

Biography 
From her father's side, she was a descendant of the Argutinsky-Dolgorukov family. Vermisheva was born in Tiflis, but lived all her life in Moscow. She studied at the Yerevan State University, Department of Economics. Then she worked in the Soviet Institute of Economics and Planning as a senior advisor.

She was the author of 8 poetic books and numerous analytical articles. Since 1974 she was a member of the Union of Soviet Writers. Then she headed the Russian-speaking section of the Writers Union of Armenia and was a member of the Union of Writers of Moscow. She was the co-chairman of Moscow society for Armenian-Russian friendship.

Seda Vermisheva was the author of  the "Tectonics of External and Internal Borders of the USSR" (Library of Russian-Armenian initiatives Centre, M., 1997) book that focuses on the "deliberate Turkic-Moslem tendency in the state-territorial structure of the USSR".

Books
Solntse stoit vysoko (1971);
Mertsayushchii punktir (1974);
Listya (1982);
Naskal’nyi ornament (1988);
Nagor’e (1990);
Scherbataya klinopis' (1999);
Iz kamnya i peska (2005).

References

External links
Biography
ARMENIAN-RUSSIAN LITERARY SOIREE HELD IN MOSCOW

1932 births
2020 deaths
Writers from Tbilisi
Armenian women poets
Russian women poets
Russian people of Armenian descent
Yerevan State University alumni
21st-century Armenian women writers
21st-century Armenian writers
20th-century Armenian women writers
20th-century Armenian writers